Kimiai (alternatively Kimiayi or Kimiaei) is a surname. Notable people with the surname include:

Masoud Kimiai (born 1941), Iranian director, screenwriter, and producer
Poulad Kimiayi (born 1980), Iranian actor and film director